Zoogloea resiniphila is a bacterium from the genus of Zoogloea.

References

External links
Type strain of Zoogloea resiniphila at BacDive -  the Bacterial Diversity Metadatabase

Rhodocyclaceae
Bacteria described in 1999
Zoogloeaceae